Gilan University of Medical Sciences (GUMS), is a medical school in Gilan Province of Iran.

Located in the city of Rasht, the university fell under the Ministry of Health and Medical Education in 1986, two years after it was established.

The university consists of four schools of Medicine, Dental, Nursing, and Allied Health Sciences, and administers seven hospitals and several research centers in the city of Rasht.

The University president was Dr. Hasan Behboudi until Jan.2014 and then Dr. Barzeger have got the responsibility.

Affiliated hospitals include:  in Rasht, Poursina hospital, Heshmat Hospital, Amiralmomenin Hospital, Azzahra   Hospital, Shafa Hospital

See also 
 Higher education in Iran

External links 
 

Educational institutions established in 1984
Medical schools in Iran
Universities in Iran
Education in Gilan Province
1984 establishments in Iran
Buildings and structures in Gilan Province